Ondřej Mazuch (born 15 March 1989) is a Czech professional footballer who last played as a centre back in FK Teplice.

Career
Mazuch started his career at 1. FC Brno before moving to Serie A club ACF Fiorentina on 2 June 2007 for €2.8 million. After two years spent mostly with the under-19 team, on 25 June 2009 Mazuch was loaned to Belgian club R.S.C. Anderlecht. On 29 April 2010 R.S.C. Anderlecht signed the 21-year-old defender on a permanent deal, who was recently on loan from ACF Fiorentina. The player has signed a four-year deal.

In January 2012, Mazuch moved to Ukrainian Premier League side FC Dnipro Dnipropetrovsk for €3 million.

In December 2015, Mazuch signed 4.5-year contract with AC Sparta Prague.

On 26 July 2017, Mazuch signed a two-year contract with Hull City after impressing in pre-season trials with the club. He made his debut on the opening day of the season, 5 August 2017, away at Aston Villa, in a 1–1 draw.

He was released by Hull City at the end of the 2018–19 season.

Career statistics

Honours
Dnipro Dnipropetrovsk
UEFA Europa League runner-up: 2014–15

International
Czech Republic U-17
European Under-17 Championship runner-up: 2006
Czech Rupublic U20
FIFA U-20 World Cup runner-up: 2007
UEFA European Under-21 Championship bronze:2011

References

External links

1989 births
Living people
People from Hodonín
Czech footballers
Czech Republic youth international footballers
Czech Republic under-21 international footballers
Czech Republic international footballers
Czech expatriate footballers
FC Zbrojovka Brno players
ACF Fiorentina players
R.S.C. Anderlecht players
FC Dnipro players
Czech First League players
Belgian Pro League players
Ukrainian Premier League players
Hull City A.F.C. players
Association football midfielders
Expatriate footballers in Italy
Expatriate footballers in Belgium
Expatriate footballers in Ukraine
Czech expatriate sportspeople in Italy
Czech expatriate sportspeople in Belgium
Czech expatriate sportspeople in Ukraine
Czech expatriate sportspeople in England
AC Sparta Prague players
English Football League players
FK Mladá Boleslav players
FK Teplice players
Sportspeople from the South Moravian Region